Dërsnik is a settlement in Korçë County, in Albania. It is part of the Voskop municipal unit. At the 2015 local government reform it became part of the municipality Korçë.

References

Populated places in Korçë
Villages in Korçë County